Miguel Sánchez-Ostiz (born Pamplona, 1950) is a prolific Spanish writer. He has published more than 50 books in a variety of genres, including fiction, poetry, travel and literary criticism. He is an acknowledged expert on the life and work of Pio Baroja. Among his major novels are La gran ilusión (winner of the Premio Herralde de novela 1989) and No existe tal lugar which won the Premio de la Crítica de narrativa castellana in 1998.

References

Spanish male novelists
Spanish male poets
Spanish travel writers
Spanish literary critics
Spanish essayists
20th-century Spanish novelists
20th-century Spanish poets
20th-century Spanish male writers
20th-century travel writers
21st-century Spanish novelists
21st-century Spanish poets
Male essayists
People from Pamplona
1950 births
Living people
20th-century essayists
21st-century essayists
21st-century Spanish male writers